Jerry Ellis (born December 11, 1946) is a former Oklahoma State Senator from District 5, which includes Atoka, Choctaw, McCurtain and Pushmataha counties, since 2008. He earlier was a member of the Oklahoma House of Representatives from 2002 through 2008.

He received his bachelor's degree in animal science from Oklahoma State University in 1969. He served in the armed forces from 1969 to 1972. He has been employed as a laborer for Weyerhaeuser and as a cattle rancher. He is co-founder and publisher of the Southeast Times newspaper.

Ellis won election to the Oklahoma Senate for District 5 in 2008. In 2002, he received the Friend of Working Men and Women Award from the McCurtain County Democratic Party. In 2007, he received the Oklahoma Rifleman Association Legislator of the Year Award. In 2008, he received the Oklahoma American Legion Legislator of the Year Award as well as the American Association of Retired Persons 50 Over 50 Award.

He is married to the former Cynthia Cox. They have one son Tom.

Ellis was named Assistant Democratic Floor Leader in December 2011. He served on the Agriculture & Rural Development, Business & Commerce and Rules Committees. He was also the Vice Chair of the Tourism & Wildlife committee and served on the Appropriation Subcommittee on Natural Resources.

External links
Senator Jerry Ellis - District 5 official State Senate website
Project Vote Smart - Jerry Ellis (OK) profile
Follow the Money - Jerry Ellis
2008 State Senate campaign contributions
2006 2004 2002 State House campaign contributions

1946 births
Living people
Democratic Party Oklahoma state senators
Democratic Party members of the Oklahoma House of Representatives
People from Hugo, Oklahoma
21st-century American politicians